Cantares del Subdesarrollo (Songs of Underdevelopment) is the ninth solo album by the panamanian swinger Rubén Blades released on August 17, 2009 by Rubén Blades Productions. The album earned Blades a Latin Grammy Award for Best Singer-Songwriter Album.The album highlights songs like Las Calles that would be included in his 2015 album "Son de Panamá". El Tartamudo and El Reto also stand out.

According to the back cover of the album Blades mentions that the album is dedicated especially to Cuba.

Track listing 
This information adapted from Allmusic.

References

2009 albums
Rubén Blades albums
Spanish-language albums
Latin Grammy Award for Best Singer-Songwriter Album